The 2017 SVGFF Premier Division is the seventh season of top-tier football in Saint Vincent and the Grenadines under its current format, and it is also the 12th season of top flight football altogether. The season started on 26 March and concluded on 13 August 2017.

Standings

References

NLA Premier League
Saint Vincent and the Grenadines
Saint Vincent and the Grenadines
football